The Men's sprint event of the Biathlon World Championships 2015 was held on 7 March 2015 at 14:00 local time.

Results

References

Men's sprint